This is a glossary of ancient Egypt artifacts.

Glossary of ancient Egyptian artifacts and materials
 Amulet – an amulet is an object that is typically worn on one's person, that some people believe has the magical or miraculous power to protect its holder. 
 Ankh – a symbol of life held by Ra
 Benben stone (also known as a pyramidion) – the top stone of the Egyptian pyramid
 Canopic jar – vessel containing internal body organs removed during mummification
 Canopic chest – the common chest contained the four Canopic jars
 Cartonnage – papyrus or linen soaked in plaster, shaped around a body and used for mummy masks and coffins
 Cenotaph – an empty tomb or a monument erected in honor of a person or group of people whose remains are elsewhere
 Crook – a symbol of pharaonic power. Symbol of the god Osiris 
 Faience – glasswork articles, amulets, etc.
 False door – an artistic representation of a door, a common architectural element in the tombs
 Flail – a symbol of pharaonic power. Symbol of the god Osiris
 Flint knife – prestige funerary good, from the Naqada period until the end of the Early Dynastic Period
 Funerary cone – small cones made from clay that were placed over the entrance of the chapel of a tomb, used almost exclusively in the Theban necropolis  (Mesopotamia had clay nails)
 Headrest – found in tombs, etc. Typically personal, or a memorial headrest
 Imiut fetish – a religious object used in funerary rites; a stuffed, headless animal skin, often of a feline or bull, tied by the tail to a pole, terminating in a lotus bud and inserted into a stand
 Microlith – ancient Egyptian stone flakes
 Menat – an amulet worn around the neck. Also a musical instrument, a metal rattle (see also: sistrum)
 Menhed – a scribe's pallet
 Mummy – body after mummification
 Naos – religious shrine; portable shrine for carrying a god
 Ostracon – pottery sherd, limestone Sherd, used as writing material
 Cosmetic palette – slab of stone, sometimes decorated, used for preparing cosmetics. See: Narmer Palette; and: :Category:Archaeological palettes.
 Papyrus – a material made from papyrus reeds, used as writing and painting material
 Pectoral (Ancient Egypt) – many forms. (Up to 13 additional Gardiner-unlisted determinative hieroglyphs for the "pectoral"; See Gardiner's sign list.)
 Rosetta Stone – A stone with three languages on it, which unlocked the Egyptian language
 Saqqara Bird – wooden bird model
 Sarcophagus – a funeral receptacle for a corpse, most commonly carved in stone
 Scarab – amulet or seal in the form of an  abstract dung beetle
 Senet – a board game
 Shabti – figurines placed in the tomb as substitutes for the tomb owner in the next world
 Sphinx
 Pyramid – a monumental structure with a square or triangular base and sloping sides that meet in a point at the top, especially one built of stone as a royal tomb in ancient Egypt
 Statuary – pharaonic and non-pharaonic. (Range of sizes.)
 Amulets – numerous, (and predynastic).
 Stele
 Boundary Stele – placed at boundaries.
 Memorial Stele – pharaonic or non-pharaonic.
 Monumental Stele – offered to gods, special individuals.
 Votive Stele – private, dedication.
 Victory Stele – pharaonic.
 Talatat –  limestone wall blocks, at times painted.
 Ushabti – shabtis from the 21st Dynasty and later.

See also 
Grave goods
Votive deposit

References
Reeves, Nicholas.  Ancient Egypt, The Great Discoveries, a Year-by-Year Chronicle,
 Nicholas Reeves, (Thames and Hudson Ltd. London), c.2000. Glossary: p. 242

Egyptology
Egypt artifacts
Wikipedia glossaries using unordered lists